Le-Roy Quido Mohamed (16 August 1989), who performs under the name Quido, is a Namibian rapper. He rose to fame in 2010 with a song entitled "Die For My City". He then put the underground rap game on hold and decided to go into the mainstream music scene, during which he dropped a couple of mixtapes. In 2010 he created a hype as huge as that of an album when he dropped the Who Is Quido? mixtape.

Music career
Quido signed to the 061 Music label, Kanibal was initially the one that was eager to sign him to his Black Market label but had too many projects on his hands. He dropped his debut album in the last quarter of 2011.

Discography
2011: Soweto Boi -Certified
2011: 061Music presents - The Compilation

Mixtapes 
2010/2011: Who Is Quido?
2009: Hustlementals
2009: Illegitimate In Da Game

References

External links
  Quido Official Twitter

1989 births
Musicians from Windhoek
Namibian hip hop musicians
21st-century Namibian male singers
Living people